Heather Fargo (born December 12, 1952) is an American politician who served as mayor and was a former City Council Member of Sacramento, California. She was sworn in as mayor in November 2000, replacing Jimmie R. Yee, and served until December 2008, when she was defeated for reelection by Kevin Johnson.

Early life and education
Born in Oakland, California, Fargo grew up in Santa Maria and graduated from Stagg High School. She received a Bachelor of Science degree in environmental planning and management from the University of California, Davis in 1975. In 1981, Fargo earned a Certificate of Completion from the Revenue Sources Management School in Boulder, Colorado. She also completed the State and Local Government Executive Program at the John F. Kennedy School of Government at Harvard University in 1991.

Career
Fargo was first elected to the Sacramento City Council in 1989 to a five-year term as Sacramento was transitioning to even year citywide elections. Fargo represented District One which includes Downtown and Natomas. In the September primary, she came in second place to businesswoman Kate Karpilow but beat future City Councilman Ray Tretheway who came in third place and incumbent David Shore who came in fourth place. However, Fargo came back to beat Karpilow in November.

Upon Grantland Johnson's resignation from the Sacramento County Board of Supervisors in 1994, Fargo decided to run for the Board. In that election, she faced attorney and community activist Roger Dickinson. In a closely fought election, Dickinson narrowly beat Fargo. After that loss she was re-elected in 1994 and 1998. While serving on the city council, (prior to becoming Mayor full-time), she was employed as a manager of the California State Parks Volunteer Program.

2000 mayoral campaign 

Upon the sudden death in November 1999 of Mayor Joe Serna, Jr., Land Park City Councilman Jimmie Yee became the acting mayor. Several candidates announced their intentions to run. Other than Fargo, three other council members were also seeking the mayorship. North Sacramento City Councilman Rob Kerth who represented an area immediately adjacent to Fargo's also decided to run. In addition, Steve Cohn, the city councilman for East Sacramento ran along with Robbie Waters who represents the Pocket and Greenhaven areas decided to run along with several lesser known candidates that included businessman and attorney Joe Genshlea and community activist Julie Padilla. Fargo, who won 22% of the vote in the primary and Kerth who won 20% of the vote made it into the November runoff, where Fargo was elected with just 53% of the vote. In winning, Fargo became the first Latina mayor of an American city.

2004 mayoral campaign 

Fargo did not face as stiff competition in her 2004 re-election. Her main opponent was Ross W. Relles, Jr., a businessman. Other candidates were Deputy Attorney General Mark Soble and Lorenzo Patino Law School President Leonard Padilla. Virtually unopposed against candidates far less funded, Fargo won solidly in the primary election, thus no runoff was necessary.

2008 mayoral campaign 

The primary election for mayor took place on June 3, 2008. Fargo received 39% of the vote, while former NBA star and Sacramento native Kevin Johnson received 46% of the vote. Since neither received a majority of the votes, a run off election was scheduled for November 2008, where she was defeated by a margin of 58% to 42%.

During the primary election campaign, Fargo initially claimed that she had the support of all the city councilmembers. Yet, Councilman Robbie Waters, Steve Cohn, and Sandra Sheedy all ended up endorsing Johnson during the primary. On September 4, 2008, only Councilman Kevin McCarty endorsed Heather Fargo.

Political positions

Environment
Fargo was a founding member and the first secretary of the Sacramento Tree Foundation, which is considered an important voice in Sacramento's environmental community.

Gun control
During her tenure Mayor Fargo became a member of the Mayors Against Illegal Guns Coalition, an organization formed in 2006 and co-chaired by New York City mayor Michael Bloomberg and Boston mayor Thomas Menino.

Women's rights 
Fargo is a long term advocate for women in politics. After she left office Fargo has continued to encourage women to run for office. Fargo is also active in promoting awareness about the history of women's suffrage.

Mayoral tenure
Mayor Fargo's tenure as mayor included disagreements with the Maloof family, owners of the NBA's Sacramento Kings, over the building of a new arena.

In 2006, 2007, and 2008, Mayor Fargo was named "Best Local Elected Official" by the readers of Sacramento Magazine in their annual poll.

Electoral history

2000 primary election for mayor of Sacramento

2000 general election for mayor of Sacramento

2004 primary election for mayor of Sacramento 

Because Fargo received a majority of the votes in the primary election, no general election was necessary.

2008 primary election for mayor of Sacramento 

Johnson and Fargo proceeded to a runoff election on November 5.

2008 general election for mayor of Sacramento

Precincts Reporting - 215 out of 391

References

 
 

 
 

1952 births
Harvard Kennedy School alumni
Living people
Mayors of Sacramento, California
Politicians from Oakland, California
University of California, Davis alumni
Women mayors of places in California
California Democrats
Sacramento City Council members
21st-century American women